The striped pipit (Anthus lineiventris) is a species of bird in the family Motacillidae, which is native to Africa southwards of the equator.

Range and habitat
It is found in Angola, Botswana, Burundi, DRC, Eswatini, Kenya, Malawi, Mozambique, Rwanda, South Africa, Tanzania, Zambia, and Zimbabwe.
Its natural habitat is rocky areas in dry to mesic savanna.

Taxonomy and systematics 
The striped pipit forms a species complex with the African rock pipit.

Subspecies 
There are two subspecies:

 A. l. stygium Clancey, 1952 – Angola, Kenya, DRC, Zambia, Botswana, Zimbabwe, Mozambique, South Africa
 A. l. lineiventris Sundevall, 1851 – Botswana, South Africa and Eswatini

Description 

It is a large pipit, ranging from 17 to 18 centimeters in length and weighing 31-37 grams. The wing coverts have yellow-green edges, and the underparts are olive brown with dark brown streaking.

Voice 
A loud, penetrating, thrush-like song, uttered from a rock or perch.

Diet 
It feeds on insects and other arthropods, particularly grasshoppers.

References

External links
 Striped pipit - Species text in The Atlas of Southern African Birds.

striped pipit
Birds of Sub-Saharan Africa
Birds of Southern Africa
striped pipit
Taxonomy articles created by Polbot